Rede Xistv is a Brazilian TV station, with headquarters in Santana de Parnaiba, a city in the state of São Paulo.

History
The station was founded in 2005 accordingly with Lei do Cabo and currently broadcasts Rede Xistv's own productions through more than 60 channels, always in HD.

Rede Xistv has had its trademark protected since 2004 by INPI.

The first programs were televised sports and local news. Now the focus is on the regional identity of the network, with coverage of local and regional events and news.

References

External links
Official site
Lei do Cabo no site do Palácio do Planalto
Guia de Canais da NET TV por assinatura 
Registro INPI
Revista IDG NOW

Companies based in São Paulo (state)
Portuguese-language television networks
Television networks in Brazil
Television channels and stations established in 2009